Politics in Senegal takes place within the framework of a presidential democratic republic. The President of Senegal is the head of state and government. Executive power in Senegal is concentrated in the president's hands.

While legislative power is technically vested in both the government and the parliament, the parliament rarely introduces legislation or votes down legislation proposed by the government. Similarly, although the Judiciary is theoretically independent of the executive and the legislature, the executive branch seems to exert undue control over the judiciary.

Senegal is one of the few African states that has never experienced a coup d'état or exceptionally harsh authoritarianism. Léopold Senghor, the first president after independence, resigned in 1981, handing over the office of president to his Prime Minister, Abdou Diouf. The present president, Macky Sall, was elected in competitive democratic elections in March 2012. President Sall was re-elected in 2019.

Senegal has a reputation for transparency in government operations. The level of economic corruption that has damaged the development of the economies in other parts of the world is very low. Today Senegal has a democratic political culture, being part of one of the most successful democratic transitions in Africa.

Introduction

Political system 
The President is elected by universal adult suffrage to a 5-year term (before: to a 7-year term). The unicameral National Assembly has 150 members, who are elected separately from the President. The Socialist Party dominated the National Assembly until April 2001, when in free and fair legislative elections, President Wade's coalition won a majority (90 of 150 seats).

The Cour Suprême (Highest Appeals Court, equivalent to the U.S. Supreme Court) and the Constitutional Council, the justices of which are named by the President, are the nation's highest tribunals. Senegal is divided into 11 administrative regions, each headed by a governor appointed by and responsible to the President. The law on decentralization, which came into effect in January 1998, distributed significant central government authority to regional assemblies.

Political culture 
Senegal's principal political party was for 40 years the Socialist Party (PS). Its domination of political life came to an end in March 2000, when Abdoulaye Wade, the leader of the Senegalese Democratic Party (PDS) and leader of the opposition for more than 25 years, won the presidency. Under the terms of a 2016 amendment to the 2001 constitution, future presidents will serve for 5 years and be limited to two terms. Sall was the last President to be elected to a 7-year term.

President Wade advanced a liberal agenda for Senegal, including privatizations and other market-opening measures. He had a strong interest in raising Senegal's regional and international profile. The country, nevertheless, has limited means with which to implement ambitious ideas. The liberalization of the economy is proceeding, but at a slow pace. Senegal continues to play a significant role in regional and international organizations. President Wade has made excellent relations with the United States a high priority.

There are presently some 72 political parties, most of which are marginal and little more than platforms for their leaders. The principal political parties, however, constitute a true multiparty, democratic political culture, and they have contributed to one of the most successful democratic transitions in Africa, even among all developing countries. A flourishing independent media, largely free from official or informal control, also contributes to the democratic politics of Senegal.

However, the image of Wade as a constitutional democrat has been tarnished by events at the end of his mandate. When faced with internal dissent within his own party his main opponent Idrissa Seck was arrested, accused of treason. Wade refused to go along with holding presidential elections in 2006, arguing that there were economic reasons for wanting to hold the presidential and parliamentary elections simultaneously in 2007.

Initially Wade's government had the support of a broad section of groups opposed to the socialist government, but gradually individual parties have disassociated themselves from the government and joined the opposition efforts led by PS. In 2011, Wade attempted to amend the Constitution to allow him to run for another term in office.  Large protests by opponents erupted, throughout the Summer of 2011, as well as large counter-protests by government supporters. The crisis has deepened political rifts within the country, which has long been a rare example of stability in the region.

After Senegal's Constitutional Court approved Wade's bid to run for a third presidential term, street protests broke out. The top court's decision was controversial as the Senegalese constitutional amendment, which places a two-term limit on the presidential office, was established about a year after Wade came into power in 2000.

In March 2012, the incumbent president Abdoulaye Wade lost the presidential election and Macky Sall was elected as the new President of Senegal. In August 2017, the ruling party won a landslide victory in the parliamentary election. President Macky Sall's ruling coalition took 125 seats in the 165-seat National Assembly. In 2019 president Macky Sall easily won re-election in the first round.

Executive

Political parties and elections

Presidential elections

Parliamentary elections

Judicial branch
The nation's highest courts that deal with business issues are the constitutional council, and the Court of Cassation, members of which are named by the president.

Administrative divisions

Senegal is subdivided into 13 regions (régions, singular – région):

Dakar, Diourbel, Fatick, Kaolack, Kédougou, Kolda, Louga, Matam, Saint-Louis, Sédhiou, Tambacounda, Thiès, Ziguinchor.
Local administrators are all appointed by and responsible to the President.

See also

 Government of Senegal
 Roger Roche, founder of a cell of the French Communist Party in Rufisque in 1925.

References